Onrust Dock of 5,000 tons, was a floating dry dock which served in the Dutch East Indies from 1881 till 1924.

Context 
In 1876 the Dutch navy started to think of a new dock for the Dutch East Indies. This would become Onrust Dock of 5,000 tons. At the time it was clear that the naval situation in the East Indies was changing. The ironclad HNLMS Prins Hendrik der Nederlanden was sailing to the Dutch East Indies. The first of the unprotected Atjeh-class cruisers were under construction, and the small battleship HNLMS Koning der Nederlanden had been launched. These ships all had about 3,500 tons displacement, Koning der Nederlanden displaced 5,300 tons. It explains the size and name of Onrust Dock of 5,000 tons. A dry dock that could lift 5,000 tons could lift all these ships, except (perhaps) for the Koning der Nederlanden. When Onrust Dock of 5,000 tons had been assembled in the Dutch East Indies it was said to be meant for the two armored ships.

The order for Onrust Dock of 5,000 tons can also be considered from the context of the Aceh War increasing the demand for dry dock capacity. Apart from this war there was the matter of replacing the 1843 wooden dry dock that still served in the East Indies.

Construction and commissioning

Design 
In May 1876 a commission to design a new dry dock for the naval base at Onrust Island was appointed. It also had to oversee construction. It had the usual staff: Dr. B.J. Tideman chief engineer of the navy and adviser for shipbuilding in Amsterdam; J. Strootman chief engineer of Waterstaat in Assen; Jhr. H.O. Wichers Captain-lt and chief of the equipment department of the navy, and J. de Hoog engineer for shipbuilding at the Dutch Society of Insurers. Tideman was the designer of Batavia Dock which was still on the slipway at Untung Jawa (Amsterdam Island). Strootman was one of the designers of Onrust Dock of 3,000 tons, which had been assembled in Surabaya and was already in service.

Ordering 
In September 1876 450,000 guilders were brought on the colonial budget for 1877. The total cost of the new dry dock was estimated at 969,000 guilders including transport. On 21 November 1876 there was a tender for the dry dock. Of 14 offers 7 seven were discarded because they contained conditions. The others were:.

Construction 

Construction was said to have started at the end of 1876. Others say it started on 11 May 1877. When the ministers for the navy and the colonies visited the Koninklijke Fabriek in October 1877, substantial progress had been made. On 25 June 1878 Onrust Dock of 5,000 tons had been put together in Amsterdam. The Koninklijke Fabriek sent a model of the dry dock to the Paris Exposition Universelle (1878).

Assembly in Surabaya 
On 16 October 1878 there was a tender for unloading, assembling, riveting and finishing Onrust Dock of 5,000 tons in the Dutch East Indies. The only offer received came from the Koninklijke Fabriek for 660,000 guilders. A similar tender in the Dutch East Indies failed, because no offers came in. The navy then decided to assemble it with her own staff, some of it brought from the Netherlands.

The dry dock was transported in 8 shipments. On 10 June 1879 the first parts of the dock arrived in Surabaya. On 9 September 1879 SS Prins Hendrik arrived with parts of the dry dock., she had left Amsterdam on 19 July 1879. On 4 October 1879 the last shipment arrived.

On 14 June 1879 assembly started at Surabaya. On 18 October 1879 a series of photographs was made. On 16 November 1879 the last plate was attached, and about one-third of the riveting was complete. By March 1880 the job was expected to be finished in 1.5 years. On 6 June 1880 Onrust Dock of 5,000 tons was launched by raising the water level in the dock pit where she was assembled. The dock had been assembled within a year. Therefore, the state shipyard at Surabaya claimed that it could compete with European commercial and state shipyards with respect to both cost and time.

Characteristics 

Onrust Dock of 5,000 tons consisted of a big pontoon of 100 m long and 13.50 m wide. In the center the hold was 3.80 m and on the sides only 3.60 m, which increased strength. One longitudinal bulkhead and 14 transverse bulkheads divided her into water tight compartments. The longitudinal bulkhead was just below the blocks on which the keel of any ship using the dock would rest. The sides of the dock were 6.75 m wide at the floor and 2 m wide on the top. On the top the promenades were protected from the sun. They were connected by the 'bridges' that closed off the dock at both sides. In total about 2,760 tons of iron were used to construct the dock.

The dock could submerge till it had 6.30 m of water above the blocks. On the inner side of the dock each side had two heavy beams on a rack. These were used to position a ship exactly above the blocks where the keel should be. The ship would then be supported by two rows of tumble beams. (cf. the model)

The dock had four centrifugal pumps with a total capacity of 3,200 m3 water per hour. The engines were directly connected to the pumps. These had a 330 mm diameter cylinder with a stroke of 300 mm making 180 revolutions per minute. The boilers were of the Cornwallis system with Galloway pipes. The boilers had a 2 m diameter and were 9.50 m long, the steam pressure was 5 atm. In case of defects to a pump, the other pumps could take over its job.

Service

At Onrust  
On 23 October 1880 Onrust Dock of 5,000 tons arrived at Onrust Island from Surabaya. She now entered regular service for some time. In 1881 the dock serviced the 3,500t unprotected cruiser HNLMS Koningin Emma der Nederlanden, the Evertsen-class frigate Zeeland and the Watergeus. In January 1882 the ironclad HNLMS Prins Hendrik der Nederlanden was docked, one of the objectives of the construction of the dock. Apart from the bigger ships she also served small warships like the Siak and commercial vessels.

The 27 August 1883 eruption of Krakatoa caused two tsunamis that hit Onrust Island. Onrust Dock of 5,000 tons was secured in place by 16 iron chains. She was carrying the barque SS Augusta of Captain Hoffman. The tsunamis flooded most of the island and flattened many houses. The difference between the highest and lowest level of the water was 4 meters. Koningin Emma der Nederlanden was first beaten off her moorings, but stayed save. Later the tsunami broke the chains between Onrust Dock of 5,000 tons and her dolphins, and the chains of most of her anchors. The few remaining anchors did not hold, and so the dock drifted. It hit and almost crushed Siak on the quay, severely damaging her. The streams made that all ropes that were connected to the dock broke, and it was only at 18:30 that the dock was secured again. From Onrust Island Volharding Dock was seen floating. Later Onrust Dock of 5,000 tons was found  only lightly damaged. In November 1883 the Spanish cruiser Gravina used the dock.

In November 1883 HNLMS Koning der Nederlanden was reported to be in Onrust Dock of 5,000 tons. Later she was in Surabaya. On 5 September 1884 she was again reported in the dock. On 18 January 1884 HNLMS Atjeh was lifted by Onrust Dock of 5,000 tons. When she had been lifted 1.5 m Atjeh suddenly collapsed to port. No significant damage was reported, but dockmaster Duyvetter was said to have been moved to Surabaya, because his inexperience caused irregularities in the operation of the dock. In February 1884 the American ship Evie Reed of Captain Rawdon used the dock. In December 1884 or January 1885 the Barque Kosmopoliet III of Captain G.J. Alberts of 3,924 m3 capacity was in the dock to get her copper skin repaired. By 20 January 1885 these repairs were finished.

In April 1885 the Prins Hendrik was in Onrust Dock of 5,000 tons when the Russian armored cruiser Minin of 6,234t arrived before Onrust Island. She had been rejected at Singapore. Minin had a draft of 26 feet, which could be lessened to 23.5 feet by unloading her guns, ammunition, sailing equipment and the like. In May she was indeed unloading, and in June she occupied the dock while Koningin Emma der Nederlanden was waiting her turn. In December 1885 a Russian squadron consisting of Russian cruiser Vladimir Monomakh, and the smaller Oprichnik and Razboinik visited Batavia. Razboinik visited the Onrust dock to repair a leak under the waterline.

After the harbor of Tanjung Priok had been made ready the Dutch government had less reason to maintain a naval base at Onrust, and so it was closed. Onrust Dock of 5,000 tons was closed on 16 February 1886. On 1 April 1886 HNLMS Banca, HNLMS Merapi, and the hopper barges Rambang and Soerabaja started to pull the dock from Onrust to Surabaya.

At Surabaya  

Onrust Dock of 5,000 tons arrived in Surabaya on 12 April 1886. In early May she had been brought into the dock pit. By June 1886 Onrust Dock of 5,000 tons had been put on the blocks in the dock pit of Surabaya in order to be repaired. The repairs were so extensive that the dock pit of Surabaya would not be available to assemble Surabaya Dock of 1,400 tons before the second half of 1887.

In May 1887 Onrust Dock of 5,000 tons was commissioned again. In February 1888 HNLMS Ceram docked in Onrust Dock of 5,000 tons. In May 1888 HNLMS van Speyk used the dock. The dock then had to undergo some small repairs. On 13 June 1888 Onrust Dock of 5,000 tons was said to be in repair. On 3 August 1888 the 5000 tons dock that had been in repair was pronounced ready for service. On 14 August HNLMS Prins Hendrik arrived to use the dock. In the first quarter of 1889 HNLMS Koning der Nederlanden was docked in Surabaya. Eight more warships and SS Prins Alexander of the SMN also docked in Surabaya, but of these it's not known which dock they used. In July 1889 HNLMS Sindoro used the dock. In September 1889 HNLMS Merapi. In July 1890 HNLMS van Speijk was to go to Surabaya to dock and to get new boilers. This probably started the months long repair from which she returned only in early 1891. Otherwise the Surabaya docks were very quite, because almost the whole fleet was engaged against Aceh, and therefore mostly docked in nearby Singapore and Penang.

On 15 October 1891 the 3,000 tons dock left Surabaya for Tanjung Priok, and she would not return before November 1896. Onrust Dock of 5,000 tons was left in Surabaya with the new small iron dock of 1,400 tons. The period was dominated by the Aceh Wars. The Dutch policy with regard to docking was that small repairs and maintenance could be done in the British harbors of Penang and Singapore, but all major repairs should be done in Surabaya. The period started with small repairs of the dock itself in the dock pit. The dock then served Prins Hendrik der Nederlanden, in March 1892 HNLMS Atjeh,  in April HNLMS Koningin Emma der Nederlanden. Many smaller ships also docked in Surabaya, but of these one cannot determine which dock they used. From 1 October 1892 - 1 October 1893 the exact use of both docks was published. Onrust Dock of 5,000 tons serviced the usual heavy units (including the protected cruiser Sumatra), but also the gunvessel HNLMS Bali, which would later use the 1,400 tons dock. In the year following the dock was used by 51 ships for 501 days. This number of days was caused by a ship leaving the dock, and another ship entering the same day, and also by multiple (small) vessels being in the dock at the same time. In 1894-1895 this figure was 37 vessels for 419 days.  One of these was HNLMS Koningin Wilhelmina der Nederlanden of 4,530 tons. In early 1896 the docks became less busy, with the 5,000 tons dock servicing 37 ships for 280 days in 1895–1896. In November 1896 the 3,000 tons arrived back in Surabaya, but she would she did not service any ships in 1896–1897. The 5,000 tons dock serviced 50 ships for 258 days. In the next period she serviced 4 ships for 20 days.

Onrust Dock of 5,000 tons was decommissioned for a major overhaul on 19 October 1897. By June 1898 over 300 people were working on renovating the dry dock. The works were led by engineer De Heer, and also entailed the replacement of multiple bad metal sheets. To cover for her absence, the 3,000 tons dock served in Surabaya from 14 February 1898 - 18 March 1898, before it left for Sabang. After leaving the dock pit Onrust Dock of 5,000 tons was recommissioned again on 20 May 1899.

Up to 30 September 1899 she then serviced 39 ships for 218 days. From 20–24 May 1899 she serviced the protected cruiser Friesland and from 14–20 July 1899 the protected cruiser Holland. Next she serviced the armored cruiser Piet Hein till 10 August 1899. From 10–16 May 1903 HNLMS Koningin Regentes of 5,002 tons docked in Singapore. This was no coincidence, in January 1905 the 5,000 tons dock tried to lift Koningin Regentes, but could not lift her further than 1 m above the bottom of the keel. This was bad news for the Dutch navy and the dock. It meant that the new standard 'heavy' warships of the Dutch navy could not be docked completely in Surabaya. Nevertheless, the 5,000 tons dock now and then serviced these ships. From 4–9 April 1910 Onrust Dock of 5,000 tons lifted De Ruyter In November 1910 Koningin Regentes docked in Surabaya, followed by De Ruyter and Hertog Hendrik. The docking of De Ruyter was made possible by unloading her as far as possible, bringing her weight of 5,084 tons back by about 1,000 tons. This expedient evaded the frequent and costly dockings in Singapore. It did not seem feasible in the case of De Zeven Provinciën of 6,530 tons.

Just before World War I, in November 1913, the new Surabaya Dock of 14,000 tons arrived at Surabaya. It was meant for the Droogdok Maatschappij Tandjong Priok, but the Dutch government changed its mind and handed it to the Naval Base at Surabaya. Onrust Dock of 5,000 tons was moved from her usual place, the bottom of the harbor was dredged out to 15 m, and the new 14,000 tons dock was moved into place in early 1915. Nothing much was done by the dock till a contract for use was made with the Droogdok Maatschappij Soerabaja in November 1915. On 29 March 1916 the new dock was then moved to the new harbor of Surabaya. De Zeven Provinciën was claimed to have docked at the naval base in Surabaya on 28–29 February 1916. She was docked in the bigger dock of the Droogdok Maatschappij Surabaya 5–11 December 1916, 14–18 June 1917, and 25–27 March 1918, At the same time the smaller ships like Koningin Regentes and De Ruyter seem to have continued to use Onrust Dock of 5,000 tons, but even this is doubtful because a year later they were stated to have used the 14,000 tons dock.

The end  
In July 1924 the Hollandsche Aanneming Mij started to poor concrete for a new 80 m long dock. It came on the spot where Onrust Dock of 5,000 tons was situated, and subsequently the 5,000 tons dock was decommissioned and declared unsuitable. In August 1925 an advertisement offered Onrust Dock of 5,000 tons on condition of breaking her up. In January 1926 Onrust Dock of 5,000 tons was lying on the Madoerawal in Surabaya. She was sold to Mr. Wijnschenk for 2,700 guilders.

Notes

References 
 
 
 
 
 
 
 
 
 
 
 
 
 
 
 
 
 

Naval ships of the Netherlands
19th-century naval ships of the Netherlands
Dry docks in Indonesia